The Thoroughbred is a horse breed known for its use in horse racing.

Thoroughbred may also refer to:

Literature and films 
 Thoroughbred (series), a series of young-adult novels that revolves around equestrianism
 The Thoroughbred (1916 film), a 1916 American silent drama film
 The Thoroughbred (1928 film), a 1928 British silent sports film
 Thoroughbred (film), a 1936 Australian race-horse drama
 Thoroughbreds (1944 film), a 1944 American film
 Thoroughbreds (2017 film), a 2017 American film

Music
 Thoroughbred (album), a 1976 album by Carole King, U.S.
 Louisville Thoroughbreds, a men's chorus based in Louisville, Kentucky, U.S.

Sports
 The Thoroughbred Corp. a California-based Thoroughbred horse racing and breeding operation
 Scone Thoroughbreds, an Australian country rugby league team based in Scone, New South Wales
 Atlanta Thoroughbreds, an American indoor football team
 Owensboro Thoroughbreds, an American basketball team
Skidmore Thoroughbreds
 Thoroughbred racing
 Thoroughbred Stakes, a horse race in Great Britain

Other uses 
 Thoroughbred, a microprocessor from the AMD Athlon series
 Thoroughbred (train), a passenger train of the Monon Railroad

See also 
 Purebred, the cultivated varieties or cultivars of an animal species, sometimes confused with thoroughbred